Christopher William Bunting (September 1, 1837 – January 14, 1896) was an Irish-born politician, merchant, newspaper owner and newspaper publisher.

Born in Amigan, Limerick, Ireland, he was the son of William Bunting and Jane Crowe and came to Canada West with his mother and sister in 1850 after the death of his father. Bunting worked as a compositor at the Globe, later becoming a foreman. He then worked for eleven years in the wholesale grocery business. In 1868, he married Mary Elizabeth Ellis. 

In 1877, in partnership with John Riordon, he became co-owner of the Toronto Mail. The partners gained control of the Toronto Empire in 1895 and amalgamated the two papers to form the Mail and Empire.

Bunting was elected to the House of Commons of Canada as a Member of the Liberal-Conservatives  in the 1878 election to represent the riding of Welland. He was defeated in the 1882 election in the riding of Durham West under an unknown political affiliation. 

Bunting died in Toronto of Bright's disease at the age of 58.

References

External links
 
 

1837 births
1896 deaths
19th-century Canadian newspaper publishers (people)
Candidates in the 1882 Canadian federal election
Conservative Party of Canada (1867–1942) MPs
Irish emigrants to Canada (before 1923)
Members of the House of Commons of Canada from Ontario